The Newark Colts were a minor league baseball team based in Newark, New Jersey. From 1896 to 1900, the Colts played exclusively as members of the Atlantic League, winning the 1896 league championship.

The Newark Colts were preceded in Newark by the 1890 Newark Little Giants of the Atlantic Association and succeeded by the 1902 Newark Sailors of the Eastern League.

History
In 1896, the Newark Colts became charter members of the seven–team Class A level Atlantic League, the highest level of minor leagues in the era. The Hartford Bluebirds, Lancaster Maroons, New Haven Texas Steers, Philadelphia Athletics, Paterson Silk Weavers and Wilmington Peaches joined Newark in beginning league play on April 23. 1896.

The Newark Colts were the 1896 Atlantic League champions in their first season of play. Playing under manager George Ellis, the Colts ended the 1896 season with a final record of 82–61, placing 1st and finishing 2.0 games ahead of the 2nd place Hartford Bluebirds (73–56) in the final standings of the seven–team league. They were followed by the Paterson Silk Weavers (74–60), Wilmington Peaches (58–79), New York Metropolitans/Philadelphia Athletics (57–69) and Lancaster Maroons (26–30) and New Haven Texas Steers (21–38) in the final standings. Lancaster and New Haven folded before the end of the season, leaving five teams to complete the 1896 season. Jack Rothfuss of Newark led the Atlantic League with both 13 home runs and 87 stolen bases.

After the 1896 season, Hartford challenged Newark's final record, arguing that it was unfairly inflated due to a dozen extra games played. It was argued that Newark also used suspended pitcher Joseph Frye, who had left Hartford mid–year. As a result, the 2nd place Hartford team challenged Newark to a 7–game series to decide the championship. Newark declined the invitation and remained champions as decided by the league. The 3rd place Paterson club accepted the Hartford invitation to play a series and prevailed over Hartford 5 games to 2 in what was called the "Soby Cup."

The 1897 Newark Colts were the runner–up as the Colts continued play as members of the eight–team Class B level Atlantic League, as the league expanded. Managed again by George Ellis, the Colts ended the 1897 season with a record of 89–52, placing 2nd and finishing 4.0 games behind the 1st place Lancaster Maroons. Rasty Wright of Newark won the Atlantic League batting title, hitting .372. Newark pitcher Bill Carrick won 31 games to lead the Atlantic League.

The Newark Colts placed 6th in the 1898 Atlantic League. The Colts ended the 1898 season with a record of  58–71, as Oyster Burns served as manager. Newark finished 26.0 games behind the 1st place Richmond Bluebirds in final standings of the eight–team league. Pat Meaney of Newark won the Atlantic League batting championship, hitting .330.

The 1899 Newark Colts continued play as the Atlantic League was elevated to a Class A level league. Newark ended the 1899 season with a record of 42–54, placing 6th in the final standings, as Jim Field and Abner Powell managed the Colts during the season. Newark finished 25.0 games behind the 1st place Richmond Blue Birds in the final Atlantic League standings.

In their final season of play, the 1900 Newark Colts disbanded during the season. On June 2, 1900, the Newark Colts franchise folded with a record of 8–12. John Irwin served as manager. The Jersey City team folded from the Atlantic League on the same day. On June 14, 1900, the Atlantic League folded. John Thornton of Newark led the Atlantic League in hitting during the brief season, batting .379.

After the Newark Colts folded, Newark, New Jersey was without a minor league team in 1901. The 1902 Newark Sailors began play as members of the Eastern League.

When the Atlantic League resumed play in 1914, the Newark Cubans were a member.

The ballpark
The name of the Newark Colts' home ballpark is unknown.

Timeline

Year-by–year record

Notable alumni

Larry Battam (1898)
Harry Bemis (1900)
Tun Berger (1898)
Jake Boyd (1897)
George Bristow (1896)
Stub Brown (1899)
Oyster Burns (1896), (1898, MGR)
Bill Byers (1899)
Bobby Cargo (1896–1897)
Bill Carrick (1897–1898)
Pete Cassidy (1897–1898)
Dick Cogan (1897–1899)
Tom Delahanty (1897–1898)
Tom Donovan (1899–1900)
Davey Dunkle (1896)
Harry Felix (1898)
Jim Field (1899, MGR)
Ned Garvin (1896)
Bill George (1898)
Charlie Gettig (1896–1897)
Jim Gilman (1896)
Joe Gunson (1899)
Bill Hallman (1898)
Scott Hardesty (1898-1899)
Bill Hassamaer (1896)
Gil Hatfield (1897)
Larry Hesterfer (1899)
Ducky Holmes (1897)
John Irwin (1900, MGR)
Charlie Jordan (1898)
Jack Katoll (1898)
Dan Kerwin (1896)
Hi Ladd (1900)
Tom Lipp (1896)
Con Lucid (1896)
Sam McMackin (1800)
Frank McManus (1898)
Frank McPartlin (1898-1899)
George Merritt (1900)
Bob Miller (1896)
Willie Mills (1896)
Parson Nicholson (1898)
Hal O'Hagan (1896–1897)
John Otten (1896)
Ed Pabst (1899)
Abner Powell (1899, MGR)
Harry Raymond (1897)
Mike Roach (1899)
Jack Rothfuss (1896–1897)
Ted Scheffler (1898–1899)
Biff Sheehan (1800)
Leo Smith (1896)
Phenomenal Smith (1898)
Stub Smith (1896, 1898)
Bill Stuart (1896)
George Stultz (1899)
John Thornton (1899)
Lee Viau (1900)
Tom Vickery (1898)
Bill Whitrock (1897)
Sam Wise (1899)
Sam Woodruff (1899)
Rasty Wright (1896–1897)
Dave Zearfoss (1897, 1900)

See also
Newark Colts players
List of baseball parks in Newark, New Jersey

References

External links
Baseball Reference
Library of Congress film of Newark Colts game

Defunct baseball teams in New Jersey
Baseball teams established in 1896
Baseball teams disestablished in 1900
Defunct Atlantic League teams
Sports in Newark, New Jersey
Newark, New Jersey